Discoaster is a genus of extinct star-shaped marine algae, with calcareous exoskeletons of between 5-40 μm across that are abundant as nanofossils in tropical deep-ocean deposits of Neogene age. Discoaster belongs to the haptophytes. About 100 species can be recognized.

Biostratigraphic significance 
The International Commission on Stratigraphy (ICS) has assigned the extinction of Discoaster brouweri as the defining biological marker for the start of the Calabrian Stage of the Pleistocene, 1.806 million years ago. ICS has assigned the extinction of Discoaster pentaradiatus and Discoaster surculus as the defining biological marker for the start of the Gelasian Stage, 2.588 million years ago, the earliest stage of the Pleistocene. ICS further assigned the extinction of Discoaster kugleri as biological marker for the start of the Tortonian Stage of the Miocene, 11.62 million years ago.

Species 
Some species in this genus include:
{|
|+  
! Species !! Authority
|-
| D. asymmetricus      ||  
|-
| D. bellus  ||  
|-
| D. berggrenii  ||  
|-
| D. bollii  ||  
|-
| D. brouweri  ||  
|-
| D. calcaris ||  
|-
| D. exilis || 
|-
| D. hamatus ||  
|-
| D. intercalaris ||  
|-
| D. kugleri || 
|-
| D. loeblichii ||  
|-
| D. neohamatus || 
|-
| D. neorectus || 
|-
| D. pentaradiatus || 
|-
| D. quintatus ||  
|-
| D. surculus || 
|-
| D. toralus || 
|-
| D. triradiatus || 
|-
| D. variabilis || 
|-
| D. arneyi || 
|-
|}

References 

Haptophyte genera
Prehistoric eukaryote genera
Index fossils
Paleocene first appearances
Pleistocene genus extinctions